A Royal Scandal may refer to:

 A Royal Scandal (1945 film), a film about the Russian Czarina Catherine the Great
 A Royal Scandal (1996 film), a British television docudrama on the ill-fated marriage of George IV and Duchess Caroline of Brunswick

See also
 The Royal Scandal, a 2001 Sherlock Holmes television movie